Geert van Istendael (born 29 March 1947) is the pseudonym of Geert Maria Mauritius Julianus Vanistendael, a Belgian writer, poet and essayist. He studied sociology and philosophy at the Katholieke Universiteit Leuven. From 1987 until 1993, he worked as a journalist for the Belgian National Television and since 1993 he became a full-time writer. He is a brother of Frans Vanistendael. He is a supporter of Orangism and a Pan-Netherlands.

Bibliography
1983 De iguanodons van Bernissart. (poems)
1987 Plattegronden. Amsterdam (poems).
1989 Het Belgisch labyrint, of De schoonheid der wanstaltigheid. (essays)
1991 Verhalen van het heggeland. (stories)
1992 Arm Brussel. Amsterdam (essays)
1994 Bekentenissen van een reactionair. (essays)
1995 Vlaamse sprookjes. (fairytales)
1996 Het geduld van de dingen. (poems)
1997 Altrapsodie. (novel)
1997 Anders is niet beter. (essays)
1999 Nieuwe uitbarstingen. (essays)
2001 Alle uitbarstingen. (columns)
2003 De zwarte steen. (novel)
2005 Mijn Nederland. (essays)
2006 Alfabet van de globalisering. (essays)
2007: Mijn Duitsland (essays)
2008: Kerstverhaal (with Judith Vanistendael)
2009: Gesprekken met mijn dode god
2010: Tot het Nederlandse volk
2012: Een geschiedenis van België

Awards
 1995 –  with Paul de Leeuw

See also
 Flemish literature

References

Sources
 Geert van Istendael

External links

devrijegedachte.nl

1947 births
Living people
20th-century Belgian novelists
21st-century Belgian novelists
20th-century Belgian poets
21st-century Belgian poets
20th-century essayists
21st-century essayists
Belgian non-fiction writers
Flemish journalists
Belgian essayists
KU Leuven alumni
Belgian translators
German–Dutch translators
Flemish poets
Belgian male poets
20th-century Belgian male writers
21st-century Belgian male writers
Male non-fiction writers